Paul Irwin Forster (born 1961) is an Australian botanist.  He obtained his doctorate from the University of Queensland in 2004 with his thesis The pursuit of plants : studies on the systematics, ecology and chemistry of the vascular flora of Australia and related regions.

He has worked at the Queensland Herbarium since 1991 as a plant taxonomist and has been editor of Austrobaileya  since 2005. His research interests are the systematics of vascular plants and reproductive and conservation biology of cycads.

He has also published extensively on plant-insect interactions. See, e.g.,

Plants named in his honour
 Aristida forsteri B.K.Simon
 Boronia forsteri Duretto
 Hibiscus forsteri F.D.Wilson
 Medicosma forsteri T.G.Hartley
 Marsdenia forsteri I.M.Turner
 Micromyrtus forsteri A.R.Bean
 Parmotrema forsteri Elix & R.W.Rogers
 Parsonsia paulforsteri J.B.Williams
 Prolixus forsteri J.J.Beard
 Psydrax forsteri S.T.Reynolds & R.J.F.Hend.
(from CHAH biography)

Some published names
 Aloe bruynsii P.I.Forst.
 Borya inopinata P.I.Forst. & E.J.Thomps.
 Zieria vagans Duretto & P.I.Forst.
 See also :Category:Taxa named by Paul Irwin Forster, and
 International Plant Name Index: Plant names authored by Paul Irwin Forster

Some publications 
 (1989) Ecophysiological, morphological and anatomical variation between selected provenances of Eucalyptus grandis and E. saligna (Myrtaceae)
 (1990) Proposal to Conserve Marsdenia R. Br. against Stephanotis Thouars (Asclepiadaceae). Taxon 39 ( 2): 364-367
 (1991) A taxonomic revision of Cynanchum L. (Asclepiadaceae: Asclepiadoideae) in Australia. Australian systematic botany 3
 (1991) A taxonomic revision of Gymnanthera R.Br. (Asclepiadaceae: Periplocoideae) in Australia. Australian systematic botany 4
 (1992) A taxonomic revision of Alstonia (Apocynaceae) in Australia. Australian systematic botany 5
 1992b. New Varietal Combinations in Agave Vivipara (Agavaceae). Brittonia 44 ( 1): 74-75
 (1993) Rediscovery of Euphorbia carissoides (Euphorbiaceae). Australian Systematic Botany 6 (3): 269-272
 (1993) Taxonomic Relationships and Status of the Genus Dorystephania (Asclepiadaceae: Marsdenieae) from the Philippines and Borneo. Australian Systematic Botany 6 ( 4): 351-357
 (1994)  Type collections of Asclepiadaceae at Herbarium Bogoriense (BO). Australian Systematic Botany 7 (5 ): 507-519
 (1995)  New names and combinations in Marsdenia (Asclepiadaceae: Marsdenieae) from Asia and Malesia (excluding Papusia). Australian Systematic Botany 8 ( 5): 691-701
 (1995) Corrigenda — Circumscription of Marsdenia (Asclepiadaceae: Marsdenieae), with a revision of the genus in Australia and Papuasia. Australian Systematic Botany 8 (5 ): 703-933
 (1995) Circumscription ofMarsdenia (Asclepiadaceae: Marsdenieae), with a revision of the genus in Australia and Papuasia. Australian Systematic Botany 8 ( 5): 703-933
 ----, PC van Welzen. 1999. The Malesian species of Choriceras, Fontainea, and Petalostigma (Euphorbiaceae). Blumea, J.Plant Taxonomy & Geography 44-1
 Terry, I., CJ Moore, GH Walter, PI Forster, RB Roemer, J Donaldson, P Machin. (2004) Association of cone thermogenesis and volatiles with pollinator specificity in Macrozamia cycads. Plant Systematics and Evolution 243: 233-247
 Chemnick, J, R Oberprieler, J Donaldson, I Terry, R Osborne, W Tang, PI Forster. (2004) Insect pollinators of cycads: protocol for collecting and studying cycad pollinators. The Cycad Newsletter 27 (5): 3-7
 Terry, I, G Walter, C Moore, PI Forster, P Machin, J Donaldson. (2004) Cone volatiles of selected Macrozamia species and their possible role in pollinator specificity and species isolation. pp. 155–169. En Ed. A. Lindstrom (ed.). Proc. from the 61º International Cycad Conference on Cycad Biology, Nong Nooch Tropical Botanical Garden, Tailandia. 155-169
 Rasikari, HL, Leach, DN, Waterman, PG, Spooner-Hart, RN, Basta, AH, Banbury, LK & Forster, PI. (2005) Acaricidal and cytotoxic activities of extracts from selected genera of Australian Lamiaceae. J. of Economic Entomology 98 ( 4): 1259-1266
 Rasikari, HL, Leach, DN, Waterman, PG, Spooner-Hart, RN, Basta, AH, Banbury, LK, Winter, KM & Forster, PI. (2005) Cytotoxic clerodane diterpenes from Glossocarya calcicola. Phytochemistry 66 ( 24): 2844-2850
 Terry, I, G Walter, C Moore, PI Forster, J Donaldson. (2005) Pollination of Australian Macrozamia cycads - effectiveness and behavior of specialist vectors in a dependent mutualism. Am. J. of Botany
 Wanntorp, L; PI Forster. (2007). Phylogenetic relationships between Hoya and the monotypic genera Madangia, Absolsmia, and  Micholitzia (Apocynaceae, Marsdenieae): Insights from flower morphology. Missouri Botanical Garden
 Terry, I, PI Forster, R Roemer, P Machin, C Moore. (2008). Does Macrozamia platyrhachis (Zamiaceae) deserve endangered species status? Conservation and pollination biology of a geographically restricted cycad. Australian J. of Botany

References

External links
 

1961 births
20th-century Australian botanists
Living people
21st-century Australian botanists